Glen Afton and Pukemiro are twin settlements in the Waikato District, in northern Waikato region of New Zealand's North Island. The nearest town is Huntly, some 14 km (15 minutes' drive) away.

The settlements were previously an important coal-mining centre, but only one large and one small open-cast coal mine still operate in the area. There was a mining disaster at Glen Afton on 24 September 1939: 11 men were asphyxiated by carbon monoxide.

The Bush Railway runs the Pukemito Line Heritage Railway, which was formerly the Glen Afton Branch until 1977. The Country Music Club meets at the Bush Tramway Club club rooms.

Puke Coal

Puke Coal operates near the Bush Tramway and has consent to produce up to 180,000 tonnes of coal a year, though actual production was described as "relatively modest" in 2014. The mine is open cast, recovering coal left by previous mining.

The coal is privately owned, so there are no permits and no public record of production. The company was formed in 2011 and employs 25 staff in its mining and landfill work.

Education

References

Populated places in Waikato
Waikato District